Kupari is a village in Croatia southeast of Dubrovnik and is part of the Župa dubrovačka area. It is connected by the D8 highway.

Kupari is home to the Kupari Tourist Complex, a disused military tourist resort.  The complex includes several large hotels which were severely damaged during the Croatian War of Independence.

References

Populated places in Dubrovnik-Neretva County